Saltlake Shiksha Niketan is a private co-ed school located at Bidhannagar in Kolkata, West Bengal.

About the school
It was established in 2005. The school operates under the Central Board of Secondary Education. It is situated at Mahisbathan, Saltlake, Kolkata. Nupur Datta is the principal Apart from the regular facilities, the school also conducts Bhagwat Geeta classes for the students.

See also
Education in India
List of schools in India
Education in West Bengal

References

Primary schools in West Bengal
High schools and secondary schools in Kolkata
Private schools in Kolkata
Educational institutions established in 2005
2005 establishments in West Bengal